The Chronica Gallica of 452, also called the Gallic Chronicle of 452, is a Latin chronicle of Late Antiquity, presented in the form of annals, which continues that of Jerome. It was edited by Theodor Mommsen in the Monumenta Germaniae Historica as Chronica Gallica A. CCCCLII, along with another anonymous Gallic chronicle, the Chronica Gallica of 511.

The chronicle begins in 379 with the elevation of Theodosius I as co-emperor, and ends with the attack of Attila, king of the Huns, on Italy in 452. The contents focus on Gaul, the emperors and the popes, while events in the eastern part of the empire find little mention. It is the oldest preserved historical work from Gaul. The place of origin is controversial, but most likely somewhere in the Rhône Valley or, as some suggest, specifically Marseilles.

The Chronica Gallica of 511, edited in the same MGH volume, also begins with Theodosius, but covers the period up to 511.

Sources
MGH Auctores antiquissimi 9: Chronica minora saec. IV. V. VI. VII. (I). ed. Theodor Mommsen. Berlin, 1892, p. 615–666, Digitalised. (Text: p. 646ff. and each second page [648, 650 etc.]) 
Richard Burgess: "The Gallic Chronicle of 452: A New Critical Edition with a Brief Introduction". In: Ralph W. Mathisen, Danuta Shanzer (eds.): Society and Culture in Late Antique Gaul: Revisiting the Sources. Aldershot, 2001, p. 52ff. 
Steven Muhlberger: The Fifth-Century Chroniclers: Prosper, Hydatius, and the Gallic Chronicler of 452. Leeds, 1990.
Jan-Markus Kötter, Carlo Scardino (Hrsg.): Gallische Chroniken (= Kleine und fragmentarische Historiker der Spätantike G 7–8). Schöningh, Paderborn 2016, . 

French chronicles
452
5th-century history books
5th-century Latin books